Trona is a census-designated place in Inyo County, California, adjacent to the unincorporated community of Trona, San Bernardino County, California. The 2010 United States census reported Trona's population was 18.

Economy

Due to its remote nature, Trona's economy revolves around Marijuana cultivation and the Trona Airport

Demographics
At the 2010 census Trona had a population of 18. The population density was 1.9 people per square mile (0.7/km). The racial makeup of Trona was 18 (100.0%) White, 0 (0.0%) African American, 0 (0.0%) Native American, 0 (0.0%) Asian, 0 (0.0%) Pacific Islander, 0 (0.0%) from other races, and 0 (0.0%) from two or more races.  Hispanic or Latino of any race were 0 people (0.0%).

The whole population lived in households, no one lived in non-institutionalized group quarters and no one was institutionalized.

There were 5 households, 3 (60.0%) had children under the age of 18 living in them, 4 (80.0%) were opposite-sex married couples living together, 0 (0%) had a female householder with no husband present, 0 (0%) had a male householder with no wife present.  There were 0 (0%) unmarried opposite-sex partnerships, and 0 (0%) same-sex married couples or partnerships. 1 households (20.0%) were one person and 0 (0%) had someone living alone who was 65 or older. The average household size was 3.60.  There were 4 families (80.0% of households); the average family size was 4.25.

The age distribution was 8 people (44.4%) under the age of 18, 0 people (0%) aged 18 to 24, 5 people (27.8%) aged 25 to 44, 5 people (27.8%) aged 45 to 64, and 0 people (0%) who were 65 or older.  The median age was 30.0 years. For every 100 females, there were 80.0 males.  For every 100 females age 18 and over, there were 100.0 males.

There were 6 housing units at an average density of 0.6 per square mile (0.2/km),of which 5 were occupied, 3 (50.0%) by the owners and 2 (40.0%) by renters.  The homeowner vacancy rate was 0%; the rental vacancy rate was 0%.  12 people (66.7% of the population) lived in owner-occupied housing units and 6 people (33.3%) lived in rental housing units.

References

Census-designated places in Inyo County, California